Susan Cole may refer to:

 Susan G. Cole, Canadian feminist author, activist and playwright
 Susan Cole (academic administrator), president of Montclair State University
 Susan Guettel Cole, American classical scholar
 Susan Cole (Neighbours), a character on the soap opera Neighbours

See also
 Susanna Cole, lone survivor of an American Indian attack